LPNY may refer to:

Libertarian Party of New York, a political party in the United States active in the state of New York
London, Paris, New York, a 2012 Bollywood film